Elachista polliae is a moth of the family Elachistidae. It is found in Queensland, Australia.

The wingspan is 5.6–6 mm for males and 6-6.2 mm for females. The forewings are blue basally with black scales distally. The hindwings are dark grey.

The larvae feed on Pollia crispata. They mine the leaves of their host plant.

References

Moths described in 2011
polliae
Moths of Australia